Saudabadis a neighborhood in Karachi, Pakistan, that is within Malir District. It was named after King Saud of Saudi Arabia.

Areas which are included in this UC (Union Council)  are: from Gulshan-e-Harooni, Indus Mehran Housing Society, Khokhrapaar, Laal Masjid, Liaquat Market Road - H Area, G Area, Jinnah Square, Urdu Nagar, Kausar Town, C-Area, D1, D2, D3 & D4 areas, S1, S2 & S3 areas till Saudabad Chowrangi, which is reconstructed and renovated by the orders of City Nazim Mustafa Kamal, The Great wholesale Tanki market where peoples from all the UCs of Malir Town come to shop Specially from neighbouring Model Colony, RCD ground etc.

There are several ethnic groups in Saudabad including Muhajirs, 

Many city dignitaries used to live here, some of them still reside here. It has many mosques, including Madni Masjid, Tayyaba Masjid, Farooqui Masjid, Bab ul Islam Masjid, and Hussaini Sifarat Khana Near RCD Ground,  Some schools and colleges also here like Murad Memon Government Girls High School, F.J Grammar School, Saudabad Government Women College, Government Mono Technic Institute and a Saudabad Government Hospital is also situated in the area, It also has a football ground named RCD Football Ground.

References

Zain Fitness Center

External links
 Karachi Website.

Neighbourhoods of Karachi